Cawdor is a village and parish in the Highland council area, Scotland. The village is in the Historic County of Nairnshire.

History
The village is the location of Cawdor Castle, the seat of the Earl Cawdor. A massive keep with small turrets is the original portion of the castle, and to it were added, in the 17th century, later buildings forming two sides of a square.

Macbeth, in Shakespeare's play of the same name, becomes Thane of Cawdor early in the narrative. However, since the oldest part of the castle's structure dates from the late 14th century, and has no predecessor, Shakespeare's version's historical authenticity is dubious.

The name "Cawdor" is the English pronunciation and spelling of the ancient and original name Calder. In the early 19th century, the Lord at the time was residing in England and changed the name of the castle, town and clan overnight so that it would match the Shakespearian designation.

Roman fort

In 1984, a strong candidate for a Roman fort was identified at Easter Galcantray, south west of Cawdor, by aerial photography.

The site was excavated between 1985 and 1988 and several features were identified which are of this classification.

The radiocarbon test gave a possible date of construction during the Agricola campaign.

See also 
Royal Brackla distillery

Notes

External links
Cawdor Castle website

Populated places in the County of Nairn
Parishes in the County of Nairn